The Nanjing Marathon is a World Athletics bronze label road race organized by the Chinese Athletics Association, Jiangsu Provincial Sports Bureau, and Nanjing Provincial People's Government.

History

2015 
The first competition was held on November 29, starting at 8:30AM. The marathon course runs through Qinhuai River, City Wall of Nanjing and Yangtze River. The course provides full-marathon, half-marathon and mini-marathon(5KM). A total of 16,000 participants entered for the competition this year, 2,000 of full-marathon, 4,000 of half-marathon, 10,000 of mini-marathon. The runners KIPTANUI from Kenya with a win in 2:11:44 of the men's field. The runners TUFA from Ethiopia with a win in 2:24:37 of the women's field.

2016
A total of 21,000 participants entered for the competition this year. Asian runners were on the wrong path in this competition. The runners from Mongolia with a win in 2:31:37 of the full-marathon.

2017
A total of 28,000 participants entered for the competition this year. The marathon started at Nanjing Olympic Sports Center in 15 October 7:30AM.  The runners from Kenya with a win in 2:20:27 of the full-marathon.

2018
A total of 28,000 participants entered for the competition this year. The marathon started at Nanjing Olympic Sports Center in 4 November 7:30AM. In order to encourage China's runners to participate this year, the organizer specially added the "China Athlete's Record Breaking Award". Any China's runner who participates in the full-marathon event, as long as it breaks the record from 2014 to 2017 announced by the Chinese Marathon platform, will receive a prize of $20,000.

2019
A total of 28,000 participants entered for the competition this year.

2020
A total of 10,000 participants entered for the competition this year, because of the COVID-19. The marathon started at Nanjing Olympic Sports Center in 29 November 7:30AM.

References 

Recurring sporting events established in 2015
2015 establishments in China
Marathons in China
Sport in Nanjing